The Cobourg Formation is a geologic formation in Ontario. It preserves fossils dating back to the Ordovician period. Technically the formation extends into New York State with Canadian section called Lindsay Formation.

See also

 List of fossiliferous stratigraphic units in Ontario

References
 

Ordovician Ontario
Ordovician geology of New York (state)
Ordovician southern paleotemperate deposits